IVL K.1 Kurki was a prototype for a four-seated, high-wing trainer aircraft, which was designed in 1927 by IVL. The designer was Asser Järvinen and the prototype was manufactured at the IVL plant at Suomenlinna. The aircraft made its maiden flight on March 30, 1927. Only one aircraft was manufactured.

The aircraft was both over weight and too heavy in the front. It had poor flight characteristics. The Finnish Air Force only flew the aircraft 13 hours.

Survivors
Päijät-Häme Aviation museum has stored the only Kurki manufactured.

Operators

Finnish Air Force

Specifications (K.1)

See also

References

Further reading

 Hallinportti Aviation museum: I.V.L. D.26 Haukka I ja D.27 Haukka II brochure, summer 2005.

1920s Finnish military trainer aircraft
High-wing aircraft
Single-engined tractor aircraft